Heliophanus insperatus is a jumping spider species in the genus Heliophanus.  It was first described by Wanda Wesołowska in 1986 and lives in Angola, South Africa and Zimbabwe.

References

Salticidae
Spiders described in 1986
Arthropods of Angola
Arthropods of Zimbabwe
Spiders of Africa
Spiders of South Africa
Taxa named by Wanda Wesołowska